Jack Logan (born 1959) is an American singer-songwriter.

Jack Logan may also refer to:
Jack Logan (rugby league) (born 1995), Rugby league footballer
Jack Logan (footballer) (1923–2001),  Australian rules footballer
John A. Logan (1826–1886), American soldier and political leader

See also
John Logan (disambiguation)